Shamiram Kelleciyan (1870 in Istanbul –  March 14, 1955 in Istanbul) also known as Shamiram Hanım, Shamiram Hanım was an Ottoman Armenian kanto singer, songwriter.

Notes

Armenians from the Ottoman Empire
1870 births
20th-century actresses from the Ottoman Empire
Singers from Istanbul
Ethnic Armenian actresses
Stage actresses from the Ottoman Empire
Ethnic Armenian women singers
Turkish-language singers
1955 deaths
20th-century Turkish women singers
19th-century actresses from the Ottoman Empire
19th-century women singers from the Ottoman Empire
Turkish people of Armenian descent